Harold Binnie Cassie (9 December 1918 – 26 September 1978) was a New Zealand cricket umpire. He stood in one Test match, New Zealand vs. South Africa, in 1964.

See also
 List of Test cricket umpires
 South African cricket team in New Zealand in 1963–64

References

1918 births
1978 deaths
Place of birth missing
New Zealand Test cricket umpires